Asia Market Wrap is a business news programme aired on CNBC Asia between 1600 and 1800 (Hong Kong/Singapore time, until December 2005. The show also aired on CNBC US on 5:30 to 6AM ET until 2000, then it was moved to CNBC World. Anchored by Christine Tan, Asia Market Wrap examined the day's headlines and numbers, with in-depth analysis of the day's financial news, interviewing key money managers, market experts and corporate chiefs.

The programme, comes from its original edition on CNBC US, Market Wrap, included several segments, such as Australia Market Wrap, China Business Briefing and Eye on India. Asia Market Week – a weekly wrap-up of the market action in Asia – aired between 17:30-18:00 on Fridays.

Prior to Martin Soong's original departure from CNBC Asia, he was the programme's regular presenter (the programme was billed as Asia Market Wrap with Martin Soong). When he returned to present Asia Squawk Box, Tan was moved to present Asia Market Wrap instead.

The programme was not aired on CNBC Asia's CNBC Australia, local opt-out – it was replaced by CNBC Europe's Morning Exchange (1600–1700 Hong Kong/Singapore Time) and CNBC's Wake Up Call (1700–1800 Hong Kong/Singapore Time).

The programme ended on 2 December 2005 and was replaced by Worldwide Exchange on 19 December 2005. Tan continues as the Asian presenter of this programme, joined by CNBC's Michelle Caruso-Cabrera (used for 2005-07-10-19 to due General assignment), now anchored by Brian Shactman (2007-10-22-present) and CNBC Europe's Ross Westgate.

Asia Market Wrap anchors
Bill Hartley and Lorraine Hahn (1996(?)-1998)
Martin Soong (1998–2003)
Christine Tan (2004–2005)

CNBC Asia original programming
Television news shows
Hong Kong television news shows
Singaporean television news shows
Taiwanese television news shows
1990s Hong Kong television series
1990s Singaporean television series
1990s Taiwanese television series
2000s Hong Kong television series
2000s Singaporean television series
2000s Taiwanese television series
1998 Hong Kong television series debuts
2005 Hong Kong television series endings
1998 Singaporean television series debuts
2005 Singaporean television series endings
1998 Taiwanese television series debuts
2005 Taiwanese television series endings
Business-related television series